Malgesso is a comune (municipality) in the Province of Varese in the Italian region Lombardy, located about  northwest of Milan and about  west of Varese.

Malgesso borders the following municipalities: Bardello, Besozzo, Brebbia, Bregano, Travedona-Monate.

Demographic evolution

References

Cities and towns in Lombardy